Gabriella Campadelli-Fiume is a virologist with a primary research focus on herpes simplex virus, fusion and viral entry. She is a retired professor of virology from the University of Bologna,  Italy.

Education and research
Gabriella Camapadelli-Fiume completed her doctorate of science (Sc.D.) at the University of Bologna, Italy. Her specialization in virology was also completed at the University of Bologna. Campadelli-Fiume primarily researches Herpes simplex virus (HSV), particularly how it enters, assembles, and exits the cell during an infection. In addition, she is interested in how HSV is induced to enter the exocytic pathway.

Primary focus

HSV entry into the cell
Viral assembly in cell
HSV exit out of the cell
Viral induced alteration of exocytic pathway

Herpes simplex virus

Herpes simplex virus consists of two types:
Herpes simplex virus 1 (HSV-1) 
 *Transmitted by oral contact, causes orolabial herpes (cold sores) and genital herpes
  *HSV-1 is the most common infection through the world. It is a lifelong infection with no cure. However, treatment is available to minimize its symptoms 
Herpes simplex virus 2 (HSV-2)
  *Sexually transmitted infection, can also cause genital herpes. HSV-2 has no cure, as well. It is a lifelong disease
  *Increased risk of acquiring HIV with HSV-2

      Herpesviruses

Major discoveries
Campadelli-Fiume's discovered that nectin is the host cell receptor for HSV. She also discovered the triggering activity of receptor- bound gD. In addition to these major discoveries, she identified the gF profusion domain, which provided the first evidence that retargeted HSVs exert anti-tumor activity.

Additional contributions to virology
Gabriella Campadelli-Fiume took part in a study showing that glycoproteins gD, gB, and gH/gL permit herpes virus to enter cells and were involved in fusion. Their research indicated that gD is not required for the interactions between the glycoproteins gB and gH/gL. Rather, their interactions are made possible due to the multiple sites carried by gB. The multiple sites of gB can be found in the pleckstrin-domain that carries the bipartite fusion loop, and interaction with gH/gL can take place successfully without gD.

Influence
Women have made significant progress towards equality within scientific fields of work. However, as efforts to increase women's participation in science fields, inequality exists. Furthermore, an underrepresented group of women remain in these fields. Campadelli-Fiume is an influential woman who continues to bridge the gender gap within the scientific community. Her achievements throughout her career have earned substantial amounts of attention and credible recognition globally. As the author of an overall encyclopedic of basic virology and clinical manifestations, Human Herpesviruses, her work has been included in the University of Pennsylvania’s 2007 Celebration of Women Writers. She has gained recent attention for applaudable women in science by the International Society of Antiviral Research (ISAR) that has featured her as a prominent woman scientist. The American Academy of Microbiology awarded recognition of her scientific achievement and her contributions to advanced microbiology. Campadelli’s profound research, leadership principles, scientific achievements, and passion for virology, continue to convey a powerful impression to those within the scientific community. Her influence as a female scientist plays an important role to increasing the status of women in research.

Leadership
Gabriella Campadelli-Fiumme is an active member and leader in the scientific community.

Awards

 Accademia Nazionale dei Lincei ‘’2002’'
 Pasteur Institute, Athens ‘’1997’'
 Fellowship in the American Academy of Microbiology

Editorial activity

 (2005–Present) Serves as an editorial board member for the Journal of Virology
 (2013–Present) Serves as an editorial board member for  the Federation of European Microbiological Societies (FEMS) of Pathogens and Disease
 Serves on the International Advisory Board for The Lancet Journal

Scientific society and academy founder

 European Society for Virology Founding Member & Executive Board Member
 European Academy of Microbiology  Founding Member
 Italian Society of Virology Founding Member

Committee service

 European Research Council
 DGXII Health Commissions
 Italian Ministry of Health
  Member of Health Research Committee from 2000-2006'

Major publications

Preclinical therapy of disseminated HER-2+ ovarian and breast carcinomas with a HER-2-retargeted oncolytic herpesvirus
 
Herpes Simplex Virus Glycoproteins gH/gL and gB Bind Toll-Like Receptor 2, and Soluble gH/gL Is Sufficient To Activate NF-κB 
 
AlphaV-beta3-Integrin Relocalizes nectin1 and Routes Herpes Simplex Virus to Lipid Rafts
 
Herpes Simplex Virus gD Forms Distinct Complexes with Fusion Executors gB and gH/gL in Part through the C-terminal Profusion Domain
  
Construction of a Fully Retargeted Herpes Simplex Virus 1 Recombinant Capable of Entering Cells Solely via Human Epidermal Growth Factor Receptor 2
 
Herpes Simplex Virus gD Forms Distinct Complexes with Fusion Executors gB and gH/gL in Part through the C-terminal Profusion Domain
 
Intracellular Trafficking and Maturation of Herpes Simplex Virus Type 1 gB and Virus Egress Require Functional Biogenesis of Multivesicular Bodies
 
A Herpes Simplex Virus Recombinant That Exhibits a Single-Chain Antibody to HER2/neu Enters Cells through the Mammary Tumor Receptor, Independently of the gD Receptors
 
Heptad Repeat 2 in Herpes Simplex Virus 1 gH Interacts with Heptad Repeat 1 and Is Critical for Virus Entry and Fusion
  
Hydrophobic α-Helices 1 and 2 of Herpes Simplex Virus gH Interact with Lipids, and Their Mimetic Peptides Enhance Virus Infection and Fusion
 
The Egress of Herpesviruses from Cells: the Unanswered Questions
 
The Ectodomain of Herpes Simplex Virus Glycoprotein H Contains a Membrane α-Helix with Attributes of an Internal Fusion Peptide, Positionally Conserved in the Herpesviridae Family
 
Coexpression of UL20p and gK Inhibits Cell-Cell Fusion Mediated by Herpes Simplex Virus Glycoproteins gD, gH-gL, and Wild-Type gB or an Endocytosis-Defective gB Mutant and Downmodulates Their Cell Surface Expression
 
Entry of Herpes Simplex Virus Mediated by Chimeric Forms of Nectin1 Retargeted to Endosomes or to Lipid Rafts Occurs through Acidic Endosomes
 
The Herpes Simplex Virus JMP Mutant Enters Receptor-Negative J Cells through a Novel Pathway Independent of the Known Receptors nectin1, HveA, and nectin2

References
 

Italian virologists
Year of birth missing (living people)
Living people
Women virologists
21st-century Italian women scientists
University of Bologna alumni
Academic staff of the University of Bologna
20th-century Italian scientists
20th-century women scientists
20th-century Italian women